Go Away Green or no-see-um-green refer to a set of proprietary colors that are used in Disneyland and other Disney amusement parks to disguise parts of the park infrastructure. The color is supposed to blend in with the environment, and redirect the focus of visitors towards the attractions. It has been compared to military camouflage like Olive Drab.

The door to the private Club 33 is painted in Go Away Green, as are most of the fences, lamp posts, loudspeakers and lighting equipment around Disneyland. At the Pixie Hollow meet and greet, a large block of concrete that is the last remaining footprint of the Monsanto House of the Future has been painted with Go Away Green, and is sometimes covered with camouflage netting. The staff painted it with their patented "Go Away Green" so it wouldn't be noticed. 

The Soarin' Around the World flying theater was repainted in Go Away Green in 2015 to make the large hall less noticeable. A grey variant called "no-see-um-grey" also exists, presumably for spaces with less natural greenery to blend into. "Blending Blue" is used to make tall structures blend in with the sky.

Gallery

References 

Shades of green
Walt Disney Parks and Resorts